The Swiss Nanoscience Institute (SNI) at the University of Basel is a center for nanosciences and nanotechnology. It was founded in 2006 by the Canton of Aargau and the university .

SNI network 

The SNI network includes various departments at the University of Basel, the University of Applied Sciences Northwestern Switzerland (FHNW), the Paul Scherrer Institute (PSI), the Department for Biosystems Science and Engineering at the Federal Institute of Technology  ETH Zurich (D-BSSE), and the CSEM (Centre Suisse d’Electronique et de Microtechnique) in Muttenz.

Membership of the SNI comes from participating in SNI projects.

Programs 

In 2002, the University of Basel  launched the Bachelor's and master's degree programs in nanosciences. The annual Bacherlor's programme cohort is of around 40 students and includes biology, chemistry, physics and mathematics.

In 2013 the SNI initiated a PhD School in 2013. At the end of 2014, 24 doctoral students were enrolled.

Projects

See also 
 Science and technology in Switzerland
Nanotechnology

References

External links 
 Swiss Nanoscience Institute
Youtube Channel

Research institutes in Switzerland
Nanotechnology institutions